Krishnanagar Collegiate School is a senior-secondary school and one of the oldest schools in West Bengal, situated in the city of Krishnanagar in Nadia district.

History
The school building was donated by Monomohun Ghose, a famous barrister and good friend of Dr. K D Ghose, father of Sri Aurobindo. The main school building built with red bricks with a tinge of Anglo-Indian architecture is itself a place of visit in the city of Krishnanagar. The school is more than 170 years old, established in 1846 in Krishnanagar, Nadia. The first principal of the school was David Lester Richardson, who later served as the principle of Presidency College, Kolkata. The school started with three European and ten Indian teachers which included the likes of Ramtanu Lahiri and Madan Mohan Tarkalankar. Beni Madhab Das, teacher of Subhash Chandra Bose at Ravenshaw Collegiate School also taught here.

See also
Education in India
List of schools in India
Education in West Bengal

References

External links
wikimapia

Schools in Colonial India
Primary schools in West Bengal
High schools and secondary schools in West Bengal
Schools in Nadia district
 Educational institutions established in 1846
1846 establishments in British India
Krishnanagar